Yatsuo Dam is a gravity dam located in Toyama prefecture in Japan. The dam is used for power production. The catchment area of the dam is 135.5 km2. The dam impounds about 5  ha of land when full and can store 300 thousand cubic meters of water. The construction of the dam was started on 1961 and completed in 1963.

References

Dams in Toyama Prefecture
1963 establishments in Japan